William Alain André Gabriel Saliba (born 24 March 2001) is a French professional footballer who plays as a centre-back for  club Arsenal and the France national team.

Club career

Saint-Étienne
Saliba began playing football at the age of six, coached by the father of Kylian Mbappé. He eventually moved south to Saint-Étienne in 2016, and signed his first contract at age 17, in May 2018. Saliba then made his professional debut on 25 September 2018, featuring in a 3–2 Ligue 1 win over Toulouse. He made 13 starting appearances in his first season at Saint-Étienne.

After signing for Arsenal, Saliba returned to Saint-Étienne on loan for the 2019–20 season. He played 17 games for the club across the campaign, helping Saint-Étienne reach the 2020 Coupe de France Final; he missed the match as the loan agreement ended two weeks prior to the final, which was delayed due to the COVID-19 pandemic.

Although looking to temporarily extend his loan, had Saliba featured, Arsenal reportedly would have been due to pay Saint-Étienne €2.5 million. The French club were reportedly reluctant to waive the fee and also requested full control over his training sessions. As a result, Saliba returned to Arsenal on 24 July 2020.

Arsenal
On 25 July 2019, Arsenal announced that Saliba had signed a "long-term" contract with the club. Media reported a contract duration of five years and that the transfer fee amounted to £27 million. Arsenal faced competition from rivals Tottenham Hotspur to complete the deal, with both clubs meeting Saint-Étienne's valuation of the player, however, Saliba chose to join Arsenal, with the club's interest in Saliba dating back to late 2018.

After spending the 2019–20 season on loan at former club Saint-Étienne, Saliba was handed the number 4 shirt upon his return to Arsenal in 2020. His first appearance for Arsenal was in a pre-season friendly match against MK Dons on 25 August 2020. He was also an unused substitute in the 2020 FA Community Shield, which Arsenal clinched a 5–4 victory over Liverpool in the penalty shootout after the match was 1–1 after 90 minutes. However, he was then left out of the club's competitive squads for the 2020–21 season, leaving him only able to play for Arsenal U23s, for whom he featured in EFL Trophy games away to Gillingham and AFC Wimbledon, receiving a red card in the latter fixture. Arsenal manager Mikel Arteta would later express "regret [over] the decision" before a January six-month loan move to France.

Loan to Nice

On 4 January 2021, Saliba joined Ligue 1 club Nice on loan for the remainder of the 2020–21 season. He returned to France after reported plans for a loan to an unnamed EFL Championship club were scrapped. On 6 January 2021, he made his debut in a 2–0 loss against Brest in Ligue 1. Saliba was awarded Nice's Player of the Month award for his performances throughout January.

Loan to Marseille
Saliba again left Arsenal for a loan in the Ligue 1 in July 2021, joining Marseille for the 2021–22 season. With fellow Arsenal loanee Matteo Guendouzi, he made his competitive debut for the club when he started in a 3−2 away win against Montpellier on 8 August 2021. He would make a total of 52 appearances and help the club reach the semi-finals of the inaugural Europa Conference League season, whilst also securing Champions League football for the club's following season. Saliba was named as Ligue 1 Young Player of the Year and was awarded a position in the Team of the Year. Despite interest from Marseille and other European clubs for another season away from Arsenal, Saliba announced his desire to return to Arsenal when speaking with French football programme Téléfoot.

Return to Arsenal
Ahead of the 2022–23 season, Saliba was given the number 12 shirt. He made his Arsenal and Premier League debut on 5 August 2022 in an opening day fixture away to Crystal Palace. Arsenal won the game 2−0 with Saliba's performance being described by the BBC as "unruffled and virtually faultless". He scored his first goal for the club two weeks later in a win over AFC Bournemouth, with a curled shot from the edge of the box. The strike was voted as the club's Goal of the Month for August.

International career
On 21 March 2022, Saliba received a call-up to France's senior squad for the first time as an injury replacement to Benjamin Pavard to play in friendlies against the Ivory Coast and South Africa. In November 2022, Saliba was called up to the 26-man France squad that would compete in Qatar for the 2022 FIFA World Cup.

Personal life
Saliba was born in Bondy, Seine-Saint-Denis. His father was Lebanese and his mother was Cameroonian.

Career statistics

Club

International

Honours
Saint-Étienne
 Coupe de France runner-up: 2019–20

Arsenal
FA Community Shield: 2020

France
FIFA World Cup runner-up: 2022

Individual
UNFP Ligue 1 Young Player of the Year: 2021–22
UNFP Ligue 1 Team of the Year: 2021–22

References

External links

William Saliba at the Arsenal F.C. website
William Saliba at the Premier League website

2001 births
Living people
Sportspeople from Bondy
French footballers
France international footballers
France under-21 international footballers
France youth international footballers
French sportspeople of Cameroonian descent
French people of Lebanese descent
Association football defenders
AS Saint-Étienne players
Arsenal F.C. players
OGC Nice players
Olympique de Marseille players
Ligue 1 players
Championnat National 2 players
Championnat National 3 players
Premier League players
2022 FIFA World Cup players
French expatriate footballers
Expatriate footballers in England
French expatriate sportspeople in England
Footballers from Seine-Saint-Denis